Boulevard theatre is a theatrical aesthetic that emerged from the boulevards of Paris' old city.

Origin
Starting from the second half of the 18th century, popular and bourgeois theatre alike took up residence on the boulevard du Temple, then nicknamed 'boulevard du Crime' due to the many melodramas and murder stories shown there. In addition to the many attractions on display there – fireworks, pantomime, acrobats, etc. – a so-called 'boulevard' repertoire emerged separate from upper-class theatre. Then, starting from the Second French Empire, vaudeville theatre and comédie d'intrigue arrived on the scene.

Style

Boulevard theatre consists mostly of comedies but also dramas. In general, the characters are simply drawn, ordinary or easily understandable. There is a strong tendency to avoid touchy subjects, such as politics and religion. The style is not designed to challenge preconceived ideas or offend. Examples include such sex comedies as La Cage aux Folles and Boeing Boeing.

Feydeau
Georges Feydeau, most active between 1890 and 1920, often produced up to the 21st century, is a boulevard theatre playwright whose satiric plays often take aim at adulterers and libertines in a manner not generally seen in British theatre of the same era.

List of playwrights

Marcel Achard
Jean Anouilh
Émile Augier
Marcel Aymé
Pierre Barillet
Henry Bataille
Henry Becque
Tristan Bernard
Henri Bernstein
Paul Bilhaud
Alexandre Bisson
Henri-Frédéric Blanc
Édouard Bourdet
Alexandre Breffort
Marc Camoletti
Isabelle Candelier
Alfred Capus
Gaston Arman de Caillavet
Henri Chivot
Jean Cocteau
Georges Courteline
Henry de Gorsse
Lucien Descaves
Jacques Deval
Maurice Donnay
Françoise Dorin
Alexandre Dumas, fils
Georges Feydeau
Robert de Flers
Edmond Gondinet
Jean-Pierre Gredy
Roger Ferdinand
Sacha Guitry
Thomas-Simon Gueullette
Maurice Hennequin
Albert Husson
Eugène Labiche
Henri Lavedan
Julien Luchaire

Félicien Marceau
Georges Mitchell
Marcel Mithois
Maurice Ordonneau
Marcel Pagnol
René Charles Guilbert de Pixérécourt
Jean Poiret
Georges de Porto-Riche
Claude-André Puget
Jules Romains
Edmond Rostand
André Roussin
Armand Salacrou
Victorien Sardou
Jean Sarment
Eugène Scribe
Robert Thomas
Albin Valabrègue
Francis Veber
Pierre Veber
Louis Verneuil
Pierre Wolff
Maurice Yvain

References

Theatrical genres
Theatre in Paris
Culture of Paris
History of Paris